Svenska Supercupen 2010, Swedish Super Cup 2010, was a Swedish football match played on 6 March 2010 between Swedish league and cup double-champions AIK, and IFK Göteborg, who qualified as league runners-up since AIK won both Allsvenskan and Svenska Cupen in 2009. Svenska Supercupen is usually contested by the winners of the previous season's Allsvenskan and Svenska Cupen. However, since AIK won both titles in 2009, they faced Allsvenskan runners-up IFK Göteborg.

The match was played at Råsunda Fotbollsstadion in Stockholm, the Swedish national football stadium and the home of AIK.

Antônio Flávio scored the only goal of the game in 22nd minute after AIK had been awarded a free kick in offensive territory. The free kick was taken quickly by Bojan Djordjic and thus AIK gained advantage and could easily set the score to 1-0, a score which would last until the end of the game.

Match facts

Supercupen
2010 Svenska Supercupen
AIK Fotboll matches
IFK Göteborg matches
Sports competitions in Solna